Jørgen Lunge (11 October 1577 – 19 August 1619) was a Danish nobleman who served as Rigsmarsk from 1616 to 1619.

Biography
After receiving his schooling at home in Viborg and at Sorø Academy he spent six years went abroad in order to continue his studies, spending most of his time in Strasbourg, Geneva and Padua.

Shortly after his return to Denmark, he left the country once again to go into Dutch military service. Before his departure, he recruited a company of soldiers which he led with honours in the war against the Spanish, leading to his promotion through the ranks.

Back in Denmark, he married Sophie Brahe on 8 September 1605.  Just a few weeks later, he received orders to recruit a regiment of 2,000 men for use against the city of Brunswick in support of the king's relative, Henry Julius, Duke of Brunswick-Wolfenbüttel. However, the king abandoned his plan and the regiment was dissolved. In 1713 he acquired Birkelse Manor in the north of Jutland.

In 1616 Lunge was elected Rigsmarsk, an office he held until his death in 1619.

He was buried at the Abbey of Our Lady in Aalborg.

See also
 Steward of the Realm (Denmark)
 Danish nobility

References

Rigsmarsk (Denmark)
16th-century Danish nobility
17th-century Danish nobility
1577 births
1619 deaths
Lunge family